Thomas Brown (14 June 1848 – 2 July 1919) was an English cricketer. Brown was a right-handed batsman who bowled right-arm medium pace. He was born at Bingham, Nottinghamshire.

Brown made his first-class debut for Nottinghamshire against Lancashire at Old Trafford in 1881. He made three further first-class appearances for the county in that season, against Middlesex, Surrey and Yorkshire. In his four first-class matches, Brown scored a total of 118 runs at an average of 16.85, with a high score of 74. This score came against Surrey.

He died at Netherfield, Nottinghamshire on 2 July 1919. His brother John also played first-class cricket.

References

External links
John Brown at ESPNcricinfo
John Brown at CricketArchive

1848 births
1919 deaths
People from Bingham, Nottinghamshire
Cricketers from Nottinghamshire
English cricketers
Nottinghamshire cricketers